The following are the main and recurring characters in the Star Trek: New Frontier series of novels by Peter David.

Mackenzie Calhoun 
Captain Mackenzie Calhoun (born M'k'n'zy of Calhoun) is a member of the Xenexian species, a race that, for years, was under the rule of the Danteri. (Xenexians closely resemble humans, with purple eyes being the major distinguishing feature.) Calhoun led the Xenexian revolution that freed them from the Danteri, a revolution that ended before Calhoun turned 20. After a visit from Stargazer captain Jean-Luc Picard, whom he had seen in a hallucinatory vision prior to the meeting, Calhoun left his homeworld and joined Starfleet. After a falling-out after the events surrounding the death of his captain on the USS Grissom, Calhoun left Starfleet, but was lured back by Picard and took command of the Excalibur. His cowboy-like command style sometimes irks his co-workers (particularly Shelby and Jellico), but he has always been able to get the job done.

Peter David has stated that the character of Commander Quentin Stone from his 1991 TNG novel, A Rock and a Hard Place, unintentionally turned out to be an early draft of Calhoun.

Calhoun is the only non-TV Star Trek character to be the subject of an action figure; the figure comes with a sword, and is highly detailed. James Cawley, who plays Kirk in Star Trek: New Voyages, made a guest appearance in the Star Trek: Hidden Frontier episode "Vigil" (season 6, num. 605) as Mackenzie Calhoun.

Elizabeth Shelby 
Lt. Commander Elizabeth Shelby first appeared in the TNG episodes "The Best of Both Worlds Parts 1 and 2", where she was played by Elizabeth Dennehy. Shelby was assigned to the USS Excalibur some years before New Frontier under the command of Captain Korsmo. She was romantically involved with Calhoun during her time at Starfleet Academy. When the series began, Shelby served as first officer of the Excalibur under Calhoun; their relationship was decidedly platonic, but she has since married Calhoun, been promoted to her own command as captain of the USS Trident and later, Admiral in command of Starfleet's Bravo Station, where she administratively oversees activities in Sector 221-G, the focal point of many New Frontier adventures.

Burgoyne 172 
Burgoyne 172, a member of the Hermat species, is neither exactly male nor exactly female, but is instead a combination of the two (as such, the character is generally referred to in the NF books and comic books by the merged personal pronouns "s/he" and "hir"). Originally, s/he served the chief engineer of the Excalibur under Captains Korsmo and Calhoun, but has since received a promotion, and now holds the position of first officer on the current ship bearing that name. Burgoyne has become romantically involved with Dr. Selar, and together they have one child. In the novel "Treason," when Selar is manipulated into kidnapping Robin Lefler's child, Burgoyne is injured trying to stop her. Seeking to make amends, Selar decides to remove Burgoyne's "hurt" by using a mind meld to erase all hir memories of their relationship. Thus, when Mac complains about Burgoyne risking hirself to save the woman s/he loves, Burgoyne is confused and Soleta confirms what Selar did, leaving Mac unsure whether to tell Burgoyne the truth or have hir hurt losing hir love.

Selar 

Doctor T'Para Lotos Selar, a female Vulcan, originally appeared in the TNG episode "The Schizoid Man" as a lieutenant and medical officer under Dr. Pulaski. Dr. Selar was played by Suzie Plakson. She is the Chief Medical Officer on board the Excalibur. It is revealed in the opening New Frontier novel story arc that her husband, Voltak, suffered a fatal heart attack years earlier when they were consummating their marriage during pon farr. As a result, she never completed the act, and was in a suppressed state of incomplete pon farr until she met the Excaliburs chief engineer, Burgoyne 172. The two began a relationship, and Selar bore them a son, Xyon. In the 2009 novel Treason, Selar, desperate for a cure for the rapid aging that afflicted Xyon, was telepathically manipulated by a race called the D'myurj into kidnapping Cwansi, the infant son of Robin Lefler and Si Cwan. In atoning for her act by rescuing Cwansi, Selar sacrificed herself by destroying the D'myurj's base of operations in an explosion that took her life. Previous to that, she decided to ease the hurt she had done to Burgoyne by using a mind meld to erase the pain from his memories of their relationship.

Robin Lefler 
Robin Lefler served for a time on the USS Enterprise-D (where she appeared in the TNG episodes "Darmok" and "The Game", played by Ashley Judd). Lefler was later assigned as chief operations officer for the Excalibur. During this time, she finally rediscovered her missing mother, Morgan. Lefler later married Si Cwan and settled with him on a planet in the Thallonian Empire, where she served as an Ambassador. After Si Cwan's death she gave birth to his child and briefly ruled the Thallonian world before leaving with the child for their own safety.

Zak Kebron 
Zak Kebron is a Brikar. He first appeared in the young adult Starfleet Academy novels, where he was shown as attending the Academy with Worf (his roommate), Mark McHenry, and Soleta. Kebron's species has a thick hide, are incredibly massive, and have a very long lifespan. They do not undergo their version of puberty for many years (by human standards); Kebron underwent this phase while serving on the Excalibur. Originally the security officer, the metamorphosed Kebron (whose personality has become far more open, caring and verbose since his transformation) now serves double-duty as counselor on the current Excalibur.

Mark McHenry 
Like Kebron, Mark McHenry first appeared in the Starfleet Academy novels, where he was depicted as having many odd behaviours. As the conn officer on the Excalibur, he demonstrated an uncanny ability to find his position in space without the aid of navigational instruments. It was later discovered that these abilities were due to his parentage: his great-grandparents were Starfleet Lieutenant Carolyn Palamas and the Greek god Apollo, both of whom appeared in the Star Trek: The Original Series episode "Who Mourns for Adonais?". Since discovering the source of his abilities (which have expanded significantly from what they first appeared), McHenry has left his post on the Excalibur.

Soleta 
Soleta was the third of the characters that originated in the Starfleet Academy novels. She is half-Vulcan and half-Romulan. Soleta served as the science officer of the Excalibur for many years until her true heritage was revealed. She then allied herself with the Romulan Empire and served as captain of the stealth ship Spectre. However, after the Romulan emperor was assassinated during a coup (depicted in the film Star Trek Nemesis), Soleta undertook freelance espionage engagements in support of the Thallonians or Mackenzie Calhoun.

Si Cwan 
Si Cwan was once a ruler of the Thallonian Empire, until that Empire fell. His commitment to justice was surpassed only by his sense of his own importance. Si Cwan had a commanding presence, and was renowned in physical combat. He served for a time as an ambassador on the Excalibur before the creation of the New Thallonian Empire, which he ruled with his Nelkarite rival, Fhermus. He eventually married Robin Lefler, who served as Starfleet ambassador to his empire. Si Cwan met his death at the hands of Fhermus.

Edward Jellico 
Admiral Edward Jellico originally appeared in the TNG episodes "Chain of Command Parts 1 and 2" (as played by Ronny Cox), at which time he held the rank of Captain. As the New Frontier series began, Jellico was the admiral serving over Sector 221-G. He had a rather hostile relationship with Calhoun, although this relationship has softened over the years.

Janos 
Janos was originally described as a sentient Mugato, but (at the request of Pocket Books) his species was later described as a mutation of several animal and sentient species, including Mugato and Caitian. Although Janos served for a time as a security officer on the Excalibur, he eventually devolved to a more bestial form. He currently resides on Neural ("A Private Little War"), the world where he was originally created, and is no longer an active member of Starfleet.

Kat Mueller 
Kat Mueller served as the XO (used here to mean the equivalent of the first officer for the night watch) of the Excalibur, but later became the first officer and eventually captain of the Trident. She sports a scar similar to Calhoun's (hers a Heidelberg fencing scar, his from a more brutal event in his youth). They are also former lovers from when they served together on the USS Grissom. Mueller also had a brief affair with Si Cwan.

Arex 

Arex originally served on the USS Enterprise under Captain James T. Kirk (as portrayed in the animated Star Trek, where he was voiced by James Doohan) as a navigation officer. The three-armed, three-legged officer was stuck in time until he was later recovered by Starfleet. Arex currently serves as the chief of security on the USS Trident.

M'Ress 

M'Ress (also portrayed in the animated Star Trek, where she was voiced by Majel Barrett) served with Arex on the USS Enterprise as a communications officer. Like Arex, she was thrown forward in time nearly a century, and eventually joined the crew of the Trident as a science officer. M'Ress had some difficulty adapting to her new time period, which was not helped when she was mind-raped by another member of the crew. She has since adapted well, and now serves as chief science officer on the Trident. M'Ress is a Caitian and has many cat-like features, including pointed ears, a mane, and a tail.

Kalinda 
The younger sister of Si Cwan. (Her name was spelled "Kallinda" in many of the early books in the series.) She was hidden from Cwan after the fall of the Thallonian Empire. She has the special ability to see and converse with the dead.

Moke 
The adopted son of Mackenzie Calhoun. Like McHenry, his parentage includes a godlike being, from which he inherited some control over the weather.

Xyon 
The first Xyon was the son that Mackenzie Calhoun didn't realize that he had. Xyon briefly traveled with the Excalibur (where he became romantically involved with Kalinda) before faking his own death. He later resurfaced when Kalinda became engaged to another individual.

Dr. Xy 

After the original Xyon faked his death, the offspring of Burgoyne 172 and Dr. Selar was named after Xyon, though he is informally addressed by the diminutive Xy. Due to his nature as a Vulcan/Hermat hybrid, the second Xyon possesses an incredible intellect but has aged rapidly; his lifespan would seem to be brief compared to either of his parents'. At the chronological age of four, he held a doctorate and served as science officer of the Excalibur.

Morgan Primus 
Robin Lefler's mother. She bears a resemblance to Number One, Nurse Christine Chapel, Lwaxana Troi and the voice of Federation computers (all played by Majel Barrett). It is implied in Excalibur: Renaissance that Morgan Primus was, at one point, Number One (whose real name was never revealed on the show). Her seemingly immortal body was destroyed during an attack by the Greek gods, but her mind was integrated into the Excalibur computer, where it remained for some time and grew in power.

Takahashi 
Romeo Takahashi (or "Hash") served as the conn officer aboard the Trident.

Tania Tobias 
Tania Tobias originally appeared in David's Starfleet Academy novels. Newly assigned to the Excalibur in the book Missing in Action, she had suffered a trauma at her previous post on the "worlds within worlds" project which occasionally causes her to break out in uncontrollable panic attacks. She is in a romantic relationship with Kalinda. Tania believes she also has extra-normal powers that allows her to sense danger.

References 

New Frontier
Lists of literary characters